Watrous station is a railway station in Watrous, Saskatchewan, Canada. It was established by Canadian National Railway, but the building was eventually torn down. The station now serves as a flag stop for Via Rail's The Canadian, with 48 hours advance notice required.

References

External links 
Model of the Train Station, circa 1909
Via Rail Station Information

Via Rail stations in Saskatchewan
Railway stations in Canada opened in 1909
1909 establishments in Saskatchewan